Teresa Zurek (born 29 July 1998) is a German racewalker.

In 2016, she finished in 11th place in the women's 10,000 metres walk at the 2016 IAAF World U20 Championships held in Bydgoszcz, Poland. The following year, she won the silver medal in the women's 10,000 metres walk at the 2017 European Athletics U20 Championships held in Grosseto, Italy. In 2018, she competed in the women's 20 kilometres walk at the 2018 European Athletics Championships held in Berlin, Germany. She finished in 20th place.

In 2019, she finished in 8th place in the women's 20 kilometres walk event at the European Athletics U23 Championships held in Gävle, Sweden. In the same year, she won the bronze medal in the women's 20 kilometres walk at the 2019 Military World Games held in Wuhan, China.

References

External links 
 

Living people
1998 births
Place of birth missing (living people)
German female racewalkers
German national athletics champions